Frederick Perkins Stevens (1820 – 17 May 1888) was a merchant and politician in colonial Victoria, a member of the Victorian Legislative Council.

Early life
Stevens was born in Hobart Town, Van Diemen's Land (now Tasmania), the  son of Sylvester Stamford Stephen and Bridget, née Edwards.

Colonial Australia
Stevens arrived in the Port Phillip District around 1837. On 31 May 1853 Stevens was elected to the unicameral Victorian Legislative Council for Belfast and Warrnambool. Stevens held this position until resigning in May 1854.

Stevens died in Deniliquin, New South Wales on 17 May 1888, he  married twice.

References

 

1820 births
1888 deaths
Members of the Victorian Legislative Council
Politicians from Hobart
19th-century Australian politicians